The Institute of Water is the main professional association for the water industry in the UK.

History
It was founded in 1945 as the Association of Water Distribution Officers. It was incorporated on 12 October 1954. It became the Institution of Water Officers in 1990, then the current name in 2010.

Function

Accreditation
It maintains a register of engineers in the British water industry, being affiliated to the Engineering Council to register Chartered Engineer (CEng) since 1998, Incorporated Engineer (IEng) and Engineering Technician (EngTech) since 1973. It is affiliated to the Society for the Environment since 2004. It is also affiliated with the Science Council to award Registered Science Technician (RSciTech), Registered Scientist (RSci), and Chartered Scientist (CSci).

Structure
It is situated on Team Valley Trading Estate in the Metropolitan Borough of Gateshead, west of the River Team. It has been in North East England since 1975, and in Gateshead since 1998.

See also
 Chartered Institution of Water and Environmental Management, situated in the London Borough of Camden
 List of professional associations in the United Kingdom
 Natural Environment Research Council

References

External links
 Institute of Water
 Science Council

ECUK Licensed Members
Gateshead
Organisations based in Tyne and Wear
Organizations established in 1945
Professional associations based in the United Kingdom
Science and technology in Tyne and Wear
Water industry
Water organizations
Water supply and sanitation in the United Kingdom